Strictly for the Birds is a 1964 British comedy film directed by Vernon Sewell and starring Tony Tanner, Joan Sims and Graham Stark. Terry Blessing seems to be having a lucky day, winning at gambling, until a woman with whom he'd had an assignation six years previously 'phones him and claims her child is his son.

It was made at Beaconsfield Studios as a second feature for distribution by the Rank Organisation. The film was an apparent attempt to imitate Sparrows Can't Sing (1963) with which is shared a setting in the East End of London.

Plot

Terry Blessing creates a gambling system involving continual use of a ready reckoner.

Although his system is very successful, he is ultimately robbed of his winnings by a well-bred young lady whom he accidentally meets after trying to impress her. The minor compensation, of regaining his original stake on a raffle, is also denied him, as it's merely the same amount that he owes to another.

Title Song

The film's title song, 'Strictly for the Birds', was recorded by Birmingham pop group Pat Wayne and the Beachcombers, and was released on Columbia Records DB 7262.

Cast
 Tony Tanner as Terry Blessing
 Joan Sims as Peggy Blessing
 Graham Stark as Hartley
 Jeanne Moody as Claire
 Alan Baulch as Alfie
 Toni Palmer as Bridget
 Valerie Walsh as Maxine
 Carol Cleveland as Sandra
 Bernard Goldman as Mendoza
 Murray Kash as Mario
 Christine Hargreaves as Linda
 Eddie Leslie as Traffic Warden
 Eric Dodson as George
 Clement Freud as croupier in the casino

References

Bibliography
Chibnall, Steve & McFarlane, Brian. The British 'B' Film. Palgrave MacMillan, 2009.

External links

1964 films
1964 comedy films
Films directed by Vernon Sewell
British comedy films
Films set in London
Films shot at Beaconsfield Studios
1960s English-language films
1960s British films